Hektaş is a manufacturer of fertilizer and other farm products. It is a BIST 30 company on the Turkish stock market and at risk from the EU Carbon Border Adjustment Mechanism. Share trading was suspended after the 2023 Turkey–Syria earthquake.

References

Fertilizer companies
Agriculture companies of Turkey